Annabell Lee is a silent 1921 film based on Edgar Allan Poe's poem Annabel Lee. The film survives and stills for it are in several museums. Much of it was filmed on Martha's Vineyard. The story is about a high society woman who falls in love with a fisherman. The screenplay is by Arthur Brilliant. The film stars Lorraine Harding as Annabel Lee.

References

1921 films
Surviving American silent films
Films based on works by Edgar Allan Poe
Films shot in Martha's Vineyard
1920s American films